Khadidra Debesette (born 6 January 1995) is a Trinidad and Tobago footballer who plays as a midfielder. She has been a member of the Trinidad and Tobago women's national team.

International career
Debesette represented Trinidad and Tobago at the 2010 FIFA U-17 Women's World Cup. At senior level, she played the 2015 Pan American Games.

International goals
Scores and results list Trinidad and Tobago' goal tally first.

Personal life
Debesette's twin sister Khadisha Debesette has also played for the Trinidad and Tobago women's national football team.

References

External links

1995 births
Living people
Women's association football midfielders
Trinidad and Tobago women's footballers
People from Siparia region
Trinidad and Tobago women's international footballers
Pan American Games competitors for Trinidad and Tobago
Footballers at the 2015 Pan American Games
College women's soccer players in the United States
West Texas A&M University alumni
Trinidad and Tobago expatriate women's footballers
Trinidad and Tobago expatriate sportspeople in the United States
Expatriate women's soccer players in the United States
Twin sportspeople
Trinidad and Tobago twins